Mount Breitenbach, at  above sea level, is the fifth-highest peak in the U.S. state of Idaho and the fourth-highest in the Lost River Range. The peak is located in Salmon-Challis National Forest in Custer County.

References 

Breitenbach
Breitenbach
Salmon-Challis National Forest